Bobby Parker (born 11 November 1952) is an English former professional footballer. He played for Coventry City, Carlisle United and Queen of the South.

He left Coventry City to join Carlisle United with whom he played for in their only season in England's top division along with Chris Balderstone, displacing Balderstone from central defence back into midfield.

He then joined Dumfries club Queen of the South with whom he was part of Nobby Clark's side that won promotion to the then middle division of Scottish football in 1986. His teammates included George Cloy and Jimmy Robertson.

References

External links

1952 births
Living people
Footballers from Coventry
English footballers
Association football defenders
Coventry City F.C. players
Carlisle United F.C. players
Queen of the South F.C. players
English Football League players
Scottish Football League players